Emerald Mountain is a census-designated place in Elmore County, Alabama, United States. Its population was 2,561 as of the 2010 census.

It is a planned community with an Architectural Review Board and a Homeowners Association of which membership is mandatory.

Community facilities include a tennis center, equestrian center and golf club.

Demographics

Education
It is in the Elmore County Public School System.

References

Census-designated places in Elmore County, Alabama
Census-designated places in Alabama